The University of New Orleans (UNO) is a public research university in New Orleans, Louisiana. It is a member of the University of Louisiana System and the Urban 13 association. It is classified among "R2: Doctoral Universities – High research activity".

History
State Senator Theodore M. Hickey of New Orleans in 1956 authored the act which established the University of New Orleans. At the time New Orleans was the largest metropolitan area in the United States without a public university though it had several private universities, such as Tulane (which was originally a state-supported university before being privatized in 1884), Loyola, and Dillard. The institution was a branch of Louisiana State University, and as such was originally named Louisiana State University in New Orleans or LSUNO. The UNO University Ballroom was named in Hickey's honor late in 2014, more than two decades after his death.

The university was built on the New Orleans Lakefront when the United States Navy relocated Naval Air Station New Orleans. The Orleans Levee Board leased the closed base to the LSU Board of Supervisors. The renovation went quicker than expected. LSUNO opened for classes in 1958, two years ahead of schedule. It was the first racially integrated public university in the South. For its first five years, it was reckoned as an offsite department of the main campus in Baton Rouge, and as such its chief administrative officer was originally called a dean (1958–1961), then a vice president in charge (1961–1962). In 1962, the LSU System of Higher Education was established, and LSUNO became a separate campus in that system. To signify that it was now a co-equal institution with LSU, its chief executive's title was changed from "vice president in charge" to "chancellor."  After a decade of growth, the LSU Board of Supervisors approved a name change to the current University of New Orleans.  Nearly fifty years later, in 2011, the University of New Orleans was transferred from LSU to the University of Louisiana system, and its chief executive's title was changed to "president."

Hurricane Katrina
On August 29, 2005, the university suffered damage due to Hurricane Katrina. The main campus is on relatively high ground and the damage was caused mostly by winds, rain-driven-water, and human activity during the storm. The university was used as an evacuation point and staging area by the National Guard. A levee breach on the London Avenue Canal occurred just a few blocks south of the main campus and caused the flooding of the first floor of the Bienville Hall dormitories, the Lafitte Village couples apartments, and the Engineering Building.

UNO was the first of the large, damaged universities in New Orleans to re-open, albeit virtually, by using web-based courses starting in October 2005. The university was able to offer classes in the fall semester immediately following Hurricane Katrina at satellite campuses; the main campus re-opened in December 2005.

Hurricane Katrina reduced enrollments at all colleges in New Orleans, but the University of New Orleans was particularly hard hit. This echoed the damage to New Orleans as a whole, since UNO serves as a leader in educating students from New Orleans. Since the hurricane, the student enrollment is on a steady increase toward pre-Katrina numbers.

Chief executives
 Homer L. Hitt (dean, 1958–59; VP in charge, 1959–1963, chancellor, 1963–1980)
 Leon J. Richelle (chancellor, 1980–1983)
 Cooper Mackin (chancellor, 1983–1987; acting to 1984)
 Gregory M. St. L. O'Brien (chancellor, 1987–2003)
 Timothy P. Ryan (chancellor, 2003–2010)
 Joe King (acting chancellor, 2010–2012)
 Peter J. Fos (president, 2012–2016)
 John W. Nicklow (president, 2016–present)

Student life

Organizations
There are more than 120 registered clubs and organizations active at UNO, including 15 fraternities and sororities. UNO Student Government is the official student government association. Registered organizations are separated into categories of either religious, honorary, political, professional, social, service, organizations, or special interests.

Media
The Driftwood is the UNO weekly newspaper and is published every Thursday. UNO also owns and operates WWNO, a local radio station. WWNO began transmitting in 1972.

Greek life
The Greek community at the University of New Orleans is composed of 16 organizations, governed by three councils.

Colleges

UNO has four colleges: College of Business Administration, College of Liberal Arts, Education and Human Development, College of Engineering, and College of Sciences. The university also offers a bachelor's degree in Interdisciplinary Studies.

Campus
The university's campus is located in the New Orleans metropolitan area, sitting on Lake Pontchartrain at the end of Elysian Fields Avenue and on the former site of NAS New Orleans. The UNO Research and Technology Park, referred to as "The Beach" is located adjacent to campus on the former site of the Pontchartrain Beach amusement park. The Kiefer UNO Lakefront Arena and Maestri Field at Privateer Park, UNO's basketball and baseball facilities, are located at the corner of Franklin Avenue and Leon C. Simon Boulevard.

UNO's classes were originally housed in the remaining buildings following the closure of NAS New Orleans at that site. As a nod to campus' time as a Naval base, the oldest lecture buildings completed in 1960, the Liberal Arts Building and the Science Building, are both numbered and laid-out like a ship with Liberal Arts featuring exterior balconies for access to the classrooms as opposed to interior hallways, and both Liberal Arts and Science featuring two central courtyards in each building. UNO's newer chemical-sciences annex is designed like a steam boat and many of the newer lecture buildings on campus have similar shapes to the original science and liberal arts buildings without the interior courtyards due to limited space on the main campus.

Throughout the years, additional permanent buildings were built to accommodate a larger student body. These include Milneburg Hall (1969), the University Center (1969), the Earl K. Long Library (1970), the Geology/Psychology Building (1972), the Engineering Building (1987), the Life Sciences Complex (Phase 1: the Computer Center, Phase 2: the Biology Building, and Phase 3: the Mathematics Building; All completed between 1979 and 1984), the Chemical-Sciences Annex (1997), and Kirschman Hall (2004).

The College of Engineering building is the tallest building on campus. It has a total of nine floors and is home to the university's Naval Architecture and Marine Engineering (NAME) Program (making it one of very few universities in the United States offering this program) among other engineering programs. The first floor is the largest floor featuring large workshop, labs, lobbies, and study spaces as well as the towing tank for the NAME program. Through the breezeway on the first floor is the home of the Dohse Auditorium. Floors two through nine are all part of one large tower in a straight line and are each not as big as the first floor.

Two buildings on campus feature atrium designs as opposed to hallways. Kirschman Hall, the newest lecture building on campus and home of the College of Business Administration, features a large atrium in the center with a few satellite hallways connecting to it. It is considered to be the second largest lecture building on campus (after the engineering building).

Furthermore, the University Center building, one of the centers of campus life, has an atrium in the center with dining locations and event spaces on one side and hallways with offices on the other.

UNO's Homer Hitt Alumni Center is built around a smoke-stack which remains from when campus was a Naval Base. The smoke-stack is the oldest structure on campus.

The campus features a large central "mall" between the Earl K Long Library and Lake Pontchartrain. Before the campus was completed, there was a large portion of open green space as the original buildings were built in the corners, a move by Louisiana State University to prevent the city from taking additional land around the Naval Air Station. The Library, originally having two floors, had a third and fourth floor added mostly due to a grant by the family of former governor Earl K. Long. They proclaimed to prevent obstruction of the view, no buildings could ever be constructed between the library. It is modernly referred to as the quad and features many outdoor seating areas complete with a UNO Seal in the middle.

Campus Life Centers 
The University of New Orleans features three buildings that are considered to be the centers of campus life:

Earl K. Long Library 
The Earl K. Long Library is home to the Privateer Enrollment Center, which is "a one-stop shop for all your enrollment needs." This location includes offices of Enrollment, Orientation, the Bursar, Financial Aid, and Academic Advising. Not only is this building home to many enrollment services, but this building also has a Coffee Shop run by dining services and different academic resources on each floor. The first floor is home to a large study area known as the "Learning Commons" which is home to a large computer lab in the front, an open-concept study area in the rear, the offices of Student Accountability/Disability Services & the Learning Resource Center, and group study room. The second floor is home to quiet computers, additional group study rooms, periodicals, the Women's Center, and the UNO Press. The third floor houses the silent study room, the honors program, the innovation suite, the meditation area, and private study rooms for faculty and graduate students. The fourth floor is where the quiet study area, the special collections/archives, the reading room, various conferences rooms, and additional offices are located.

University Center 
The university center is "the center of campus life at UNO." The building is home to dining services locations, the grand ball room, the Captain's Quarter's Game Room, the UNO Bookstore, and various meeting spaces. University offices located here include counseling services, career services, student involvement and leadership, Greek life, student government association, student affairs, the HUB, the student pantry, student transitions, and the Juan LaFonta Diversity Engagement Center. It is also home to an Oschner Health Clinic and various leisure spaces. The lobby of the building features a large atrium with flags hanging down. These are placed the first time a student comes to the university from another nation.

Administration Building 
The Administration Building consists of two sections: The original administration building and the newer administration annex, an addition to the building that was built later. Many university administrative offices are located here though these are typically administrative and not often visited by students. However, it is important to note that the main office for the graduate school is located here and not in the Library.

Residential life 
The university's campus is home to three on-campus housing options for students all located on UNO's main campus:

Pontchartrain Halls
Privateer Place
Lafitte Village

Dining services 
The university's dining services are currently managed by Chartwells Higher Ed, a branch of Compass Group. They manage all dining locations on campus including the university's buffet-styled cafeteria is known as the Food Hall at the Galley. Retail dining locations are mainly located on the Deck (which is in the university center on the east side of campus) and the Cove (which is a building located on the west side of campus). Retail franchises include Subway, Chick Fil A, Privateer Sushi, Jamba Juice, Moe's Southwestern Grill, Fry Shack, and Brewed Awakening (which brews Starbucks Coffee). Additionally, Chartwells manages three convenience "Markets" on campus known as the Market NOLA (which is located in the university center and serves PJ's coffee), Market Cove (located in the cove), and Market Pontchartrain (located in the residence hall on campus).

Athletics

The University of New Orleans currently has 14 varsity sports teams, and is a Division I member of the NCAA (National Collegiate Athletic Association), competing in the Southland Conference. UNO originally attempted to reclassify to Division II's Gulf South Conference. On February 1, 2011, Provost Joe King submitted the Division II proposal to the LSU Board of Supervisors. Previously, UNO competed at the Division II level from 1969 to 1975. On March 9, 2012, President Peter J. Fos announced that UNO plans to remain a member of NCAA Division I, with potential homes being the Sun Belt or Southland Conference. On August 21, 2012, UNO announced that it would be joining the Southland Conference, effective the 2013–2014 academic year.

Sports
Baseball
Men's and women's basketball
Men's golf
Men's and women's cross country
Men's and women's tennis
Volleyball
Men's and women's track & field
Women's sand volleyball (added Fall 2014)

Fight song
The official fight song of The University of New Orleans is "Let's Hear It For UNO". The song was adopted after a competition in 1981. The winner was Lois Ostrolenk. Before this, the melody from William Tell Overture was used. A variation of the overture is still played to honor this tradition.

Club sports
The University of New Orleans has many club sports provided by the Department of Recreation and Intramural Sports. Club sports are available to all UNO students who have an interest. Active club sports include:

The Beach (Research and Technology Park)

The University of New Orleans Research and Technology Park is a research park whose tenants collaborate with the university to conduct research, provide training, and create education opportunities. Tenants have many university services provided to them, including the university library and recreational facilities.

Notable alumni

Austin Badon – state representative for Orleans Parish since 2004; administrator at Nunez Community College since 2000 
Pat Barry – UFC fighter and kickboxer
Walter Boasso – former Louisiana state senator from St. Bernard Parish who made national headlines for fighting to combine levee boards in southeast Louisiana; gubernatorial candidate in 2007, Democrat
Jericho Brown – poet, Pulitzer Prize winner
Jim Bullinger – former Major League Baseball player
Randy Bush – former Major League Baseball player; member of 1987 and 1991 World Series champion Minnesota Twins
Joel Chaisson – former president of Louisiana State Senate, attorney
James H. Clark – co-founder of Silicon Graphics, Inc., and Netscape Communications
Wayne Cooper – former NBA basketball player
Ellen DeGeneres – comedian, television host, and actress
Jim Donelon – former state representative, former president of Jefferson Parish, and current state insurance commissioner
Michael T. Dugan – educator and accounting scholar
Margaret Evangeline – post-minimalist painter, video, performance, and installation artist
Sabrina Farmer – Google vice president
Ron Faucheux – former state representative, political consultant and pundit from New Orleans
Tom Fitzmorris – food writer
Peter J. Fos – former president, University of New Orleans
Eva Galler – Jewish holocaust survivor
Jeffrey Gangwisch – filmmaker
Robert T. Garrity Jr. – state representative for Jefferson Parish, 1988–1992
Johnny Giavotella – Major League Baseball player for the Los Angeles Angels of Anaheim
Lee Meitzen Grue, poet and educator
Anthony Guarisco Jr. – Democratic state senator from Morgan City from 1976 to 1988, studied political science at UNO while in office
Stephanie Hansen – environmental lawyer elected to Delaware State Senate in 2017
Daniel L. Haulman – aviation historian
Ervin Johnson – player in National Basketball Association
Sal Khan – founder of Khan Academy
John Larroquette – film, television and stage actor, 5-time Emmy Award winner, Tony winner
James Letten – former U.S. Attorney for Eastern district of Louisiana
Nicholas Lorusso – Republican state representative from Orleans Parish since 2007
Paul Mainieri – current Louisiana State University head baseball coach
Valerie Martin – novelist
Bunny Matthews – music journalist and cartoonist, best known for his characters Vic and Nat'ly
Bo McCalebb – professional basketball player
Michelle Miller – national correspondent for CBS News
Arthur Morrell – state representative from 1984 to 2006 and clerk of the criminal court since 2006 for Orleans Parish
Cynthia Hedge-Morrell – member of New Orleans City Council, 2005–2014
Lance E. Nichols – actor
Mark Normand – stand-up comedian
Frank Ocean – R&B and hip-hop artist
Brian Palermo – American actor and comedian, and science communicator
Michael Holloway Perronne – novelist
Dawn Richard – singer-songwriter, Danity Kane, Dirty Money
Jamison Ross – Grammy-nominated jazz drummer and vocalist
Jeffrey D. Sadow – political scientist, columnist, professor at LSU Shreveport
Billy Slaughter – actor 
Milton Dean Slaughter – theoretical physicist
Joe Slusarski – former Major League Baseball player
Brian Snitker – manager of MLB's Atlanta Braves
Patricia Snyder – American sociologist
Julie Stokes (Class of 1992) – certified public accountant, state representative from District 79 in Jefferson Parish
Roy C. Strickland – businessman and politician in Louisiana and later The Woodlands, Texas
Taryn Terrell – professional wrestler
Christopher Thornton – actor
Brian Traxler – former Major League Baseball player
Chloé Valdary – political activist
Wally Whitehurst – Major League Baseball pitcher for New York Mets
Darryl Willis – BP vice president in charge of claims featured in commercials about Deepwater Horizon oil spill

Notable faculty

 Lance Africk, American judge
 Stephen E. Ambrose, American historian and biographer of U.S. presidents Dwight D. Eisenhower and Richard Nixon
 Fredrick Barton, American novelist and film critic
 Günter Bischof, Austrian-American historian
 Amanda Boyden, American novelist
 Joseph Boyden, Canadian writer
 Douglas Brinkley, American historian
 Robert Cashner, American zoologist
 John Churchill Chase, American cartoonist
 Richard H. Collin, American historian and food writer
 Philip B. Coulter, American political scientist
 Robert Denhardt, American scholar
 Philip James DeVries, American biology professor
 Robert L. Flurry, American chemistry professor
 Peter J. Fos, American college president
 Paul Frick, American psychologist
 John Gery, American poet, critic, and editor
 Bruce C. Gibb, Scottish chemist
 Victor Goines, American jazz musician
 Gabriel Gómez, American poet
 Richard Goodman, American nonfiction writer
 Arnold R. Hirsch, American historian
 Toussaint Hočevar, Slovenian-American economic historian
 Richard A. Johnson, American artist
 Richard Katrovas, American writer
 Yusef Komunyakaa, American poet
 Joseph Logsdon, American historian
 Andreas Maislinger, Austrian historian
 Ellis Marsalis, Jr., American jazz pianist and educator
 Valerie Martin, American novelist
 Edward M. Miller, American economist
 Allan R. Millett, American historian
 Niyi Osundare, Nigerian writer
 Carla Penz, American entomologist
 Frank Schalow, American philosopher
 Milton Dean Slaughter – American theoretical physicist and UNO chair emeritus
 Alan Soble, American philosopher
 Nguyen TK Thanh, Vietnamese nanotechnologist
 David Wojahn, American poet

References

External links

 
 University of New Orleans Athletics website

 
Educational institutions established in 1956
Universities and colleges accredited by the Southern Association of Colleges and Schools
1956 establishments in Louisiana
University of New Orleans